Siddharth Gupta (born 4 November 1993) is an Indian actor. He made his film debut with Ekta Kapoor's Kuku Mathur Ki Jhand Ho Gayi directed by Aman Sachdeva in 2014. In 2017, he made his web debut with Ragini MMS: Returns as Rahul on ALTBalaji.

Personal life
Gupta was brought up in Dehradun and studied engineering in Dubai. His brother, Vikas Gupta is a producer, host, screenwriter and reality television personality.

Career
Gupta essayed the role of a teenager in the 2014 Bollywood film Kuku Mathur Ki Jhand Ho Gayi. Also, he hosted season 7 of Pyaar Tune Kya Kiya along with Niti Taylor. He signed a three-film contract with Balaji. In 2017, he played the lead role in ALTBalaji's Ragini MMS: Returns. In 2019, he collaborated with Dhvani Bhanushali for her music album Vaaste. , the song Vaaste has crossed 1 billion views on YouTube.

Filmography

Films

Television

Web series

Music videos

References

External links

 

Indian male film actors
Indian male models
Male actors in Hindi cinema
Living people
Male actors from Uttarakhand
1993 births